"No One Knows" is a song by Queens of the Stone Age.

No One Knows may also refer to:

 No One Knows (EP), by Stephy Tang, 2011
 "No One Knows" (Stephy Tang song), the title song, 2010
 "No One Knows" (Dion and The Belmonts song), 1958
 "No One Knows", a song by Dexter Freebish
 "No One Knows", a song by Green Day from Kerplunk!
 "No One Knows", a song by Screaming Trees from Sweet Oblivion

See also 
 Nobody Knows (disambiguation)
 What No One Knows, a 2008 Danish film